Parasi Kalan is a village panchayat located in the Chandauli district of Uttar Pradesh, India.

Villages in Chandauli district